Cliff "Bishop" Butler (August 3, 1923 – January 13, 1982) was a DJ and a gospel, blues and R&B singer from Louisville, Kentucky, United States.

Biography
Cliff Butler was born on October 17, 1922, in Louisville, Kentucky. His earliest music experiences were with a jug band in Louisville. After serving in the Army Air Corps in World War II, he returned to his hometown and organized a band to back his vocals. His first recordings were with Three Notes for Signature Records (1948), followed by recordings for King Records (1949). Butler began recording for the States label with a session on November 17, 1952. The session musicians included blind pianist Benny Holton, who regularly accompanied Butler, as well as Chicago stalwarts Leon Washington on tenor sax and Red Saunders on the drum stool. On one of these recordings, "Adam's Rib," he exhibited a strong Roy Brown influence. On another track from the session, "You're My Honey, But the Bees Don't Know It," Butler was accompanied by a vocal group from Louisville, The Doves.

Butler died of cancer on January 13, 1982, in Louisville, Kentucky.

Discography

References

  discography
  discography
  discography
  discography
 Biography
 Clements, Keith,"I've Got a Mind to Ramble", Louisville Music News, May 2004—article
  mention, and image

External links
 

Musicians from Louisville, Kentucky
American gospel singers
American rhythm and blues singers
1923 births
1982 deaths
20th-century American singers
Singers from Kentucky
United States Army Air Forces personnel of World War II